The New Adventures of Black Beauty was a television drama series produced in the early 1990s. The show was produced first in New Zealand, then in Australia. The two different productions had different characters and plotlines, un-related except through the horse, Black Beauty.

The first season of the show was produced 1990–1991 by Isambard (Black Beauty) Productions Ltd in association with The Fremantle Corporation, and Beta Taurus produced the series primarily in New Zealand as a continuation of the 1972–1974 television drama series, The Adventures of Black Beauty. Set 20 years after the events of the earlier series, it featured two of the original characters, Dr James Gordon (played by William Lucas) and Jenny Gordon Denning (played by Stacy Dorning). The series was originally aired on ITV in the United Kingdom, and Isambard Productions Ltd produced 26 episodes in total. This production was subsequently aired in the US, where it was split into two seasons, aired in a different order, and with two episodes ("Horsepower" and "Horse Sense") possibly omitted in some markets.

In 1992, The Fremantle Corporation moved production to Australia with what was for all practical purposes an entirely new series with new characters and a plotline unrelated to the previous episodes. The only connection to earlier works is the use of material from the final episode of the 1990–1991 production, reworked and with a voice-over explaining that Beauty had been released into the Australian wild. This was shown at the beginning of the first episode of the new production.

Though video of the first production has been marketed on its own, the two productions are now being marketed on DVD and in syndication as a single television series, with the 1990–91 production billed as "Season 1" and the 1992 production billed as "Season 2".

In July 2009, Retro Television Network picked up all 104 episodes of The Adventures of Black Beauty (produced in England) and The New Adventures of Black Beauty (both the New Zealand and Australian seasons), and affiliates began airing them in sequence, listing all 104 episodes as simply Black Beauty.

In the United Kingdom and some other countries, both seasons of the New Adventures were shown on Horse & Country TV (Sky Channel 253) between 2014 and 2016.

Plot
Season 1 (1990–1991)

Unlike the original series, The Adventures of Black Beauty, which was set and made in England, The New Adventures of Black Beauty was set and made in New Zealand, apart from the first two episodes, which were set and made in England.  The series focused upon the character of Victoria 'Vicky' Denning (played by Amber McWilliams).  This series is ostensibly set in the year 1907, twenty years after the original series, which was set in the 1880s, although this was never stated explicitly in the original series.  However, this may be questionable because the Boer War, which ended in May 1902, is referred to as being fought in the present tense, which would narrow the potential setting considerably because Edward VII has already acceded.

It begins with newlyweds Nigel and Jenny Denning preparing to go to his farm in New Zealand.  Jenny is a veterinarian who has been working with her father.  Nigel was previously married to the daughter of Lord Fordham, Sarah, who died and is buried at the colonial farm.  Their daughter Victoria ("Vicky") has been staying with her grandfather when she has not been attending boarding school, during the two years her father has finished his medical studies in London.

Lord Fordham is opposed to Vicky returning to New Zealand with her father and tries an assortment of bribes and threats to keep her in England.  In the end, he accepts that it is Vicky's wish to return to her birthplace with her father and new step-mother.  Meanwhile, Vicky has been introduced to Jenny's horse, Black Beauty, and rides him regularly.

Nigel leaves ahead of Jenny and Vicky, so that he can prepare the farm for their arrival.  News comes that his ship is late arriving to Singapore, and that wreckage was found.  But some of the lifeboats were deployed, so there is still hope.  Jenny and Vicky thus continue with their plans to return to the farm, arriving to find the former overseer has absconded with the livestock during Nigel and Vicky's two years in England, and the farm is almost a ruin.

But Jenny and Vicky are not deterred; and the stableboy and general hand, Manfred Groenwald, a young German immigrant, is still there and still willing to work.  So, they set about making the farm ship-shape and Bristol fashion.

A letter arrives from England, from Jenny's father, to say that Black Beauty had died about a week after they left.  The next night, a partly wild black horse appears from nowhere at the farm, with the same markings as Black Beauty – so that is what Vicky names him.  And there the adventures truly begin, with Jenny's father coming to join them in New Zealand in the fourth episode.

As with the original 1970s series, the new series had the theme tune, "Galloping Home", written by Denis King and performed by the London String Chorale.

Season 2 (1992)

The second The New Adventures of Black Beauty is set in Australia and has no real connection with the characters (except for Beauty) and plot of the previous New Zealand production or with the original The Adventures of Black Beauty series.

Orphan Issabelle "Bella" Barret tries and fails to escape from the terrible conditions of an orphanage, after which she sets a mistreated black horse free. She makes a second, successful escape and stows away on the merchant vessel Astoria. During a storm, Astoria runs into a reef and breaks up. Bella is washed ashore to be rescued by a black horse. (Is it the same one she freed?) She and the horse are found by Doctor Austin. Her trauma has left Bella with amnesia, and she will only regain her memory slowly over time. All the while Bella and the horse are living on Doctor Austin's farm. Meanwhile, unsavory characters are about the land searching for gold that was supposedly lost aboard Astoria, and they soon realize Bella may be the key to their success.

As before, "Galloping Home" was the theme song for the series.  In the United Kingdom, this season aired on the BBC between 1994 and 1998.

Main cast
Season 1 (1990–1991)
Dr Jenny Denning – Stacy Dorning (26 episodes, 1990–1991)
Manfred Groenwald – Gedeon Burkhard (26 episodes, 1990–1991)
Dr. James Gordon – William Lucas (26 episodes, 1990–1991)
Victoria 'Vicky' Denning – Amber McWilliams (26 episodes, 1990–1991)
Frank Coats – David Bradshaw (24 episodes, 1990–1991)
Hilda Burton – Ilona Rodgers (24 episodes, 1990–1991)
Samuel Burton – Bill Kerr (24 episodes, 1990–1991)
Isambard – Claire Chitham (9 episodes, 1990)
Constable Carmody – Andrew Robertt (5 episodes, 1990–1991)
Lewis Duncan – Timothy Raby (3 episodes, 1990)
Lord Fordham – Frederick Treves (2 episodes, 1990)
Nigel – Christian Burgess (2 episodes, 1990)

Season 2 (1992)
Isabela "Bella" Barrett – Rebecca Gooden
Doctor Austin – Peter Bensley
Connie – Caroline Winnall
Kathy (S02E04) – Tyler-Jane Mitchel
Sergeant Pickles – Henry Salter
Weeks – Nicholas Bell
Walter – Peter Weiss
Ted – Peter Evangelista
Frank – Michael Burkett
Anna Swallow – Celia De Burgh
Potch – Edwin Hodgeman
Rudy Swallow – Patrick Frost
Mrs. Mac – Celine O'Leary
Aunt Caroline – Jennifer Kent

Episodes

Season 1 (UK, 1990–91)
(As aired in the UK; the series was dropped by the ITV network after its first seventeen episodes – shown on sixteen Saturdays after the first two were edited together – and the remaining nine were only shown piecemeal on a regional basis)
 The Old World (1-Sep-1990)
 A Horse Like Beauty (also 1-Sep-1990; shown in the UK in an hour-long special combined with episode 1 as 'That Old World Beauty')
 Breaking In (8-Sep-1990)
 Ride a Black Horse (15-Sep-1990)
 Deceptive Appearances (22-Sep-1990)
 Fear of Water (29-Oct-1990)
 Treasure Hunt (6-Oct-1990)
 The Birdman (13-Oct-1990)
 Different Races (20-Oct-1990)
 A Question of Justice (27-Oct-1990)
 Horsepower (3-Nov-1990)
 Horse Sense (10-Nov-1990)
 Surprise (17-Nov-1990)
 A Present for Beauty (24-Nov-1990)
 The Sea Horses (1-Dec-1990)
 Hope (8-Dec-1990)
 At Risk (15-Dec-1990)
 Greed Fever (ITV London region 9-May-1993)
 The Poisoners (ITV London region 16-May-1993)
 Bush Symphony (ITV London region probably 30-May-1993)
 The Convicts (ITV London region probably 6-June-1993)
 A Friend in Need (ITV London region probably 13-June-1993)
 Out of Sight, Out of Mind (ITV London region 20-June-1993)
 Deception (ITV London region probably 27-June-1993)
 Call of the Wild (Part One) (ITV London region probably 4-July-1993)
 Call of the Wild (Part Two) (ITV London region 18-July-1993)

Season 1 (US, 1990–91)
(As aired in the US in two seasons, per TV.com)

Season One
 The Old World
 A Horse Like Beauty
 Breaking In
 Ride a Black Horse
 Deceptive Appearances
 Fear of Water
 Treasure Hunt
 The Birdman
 Different Races
 A Question of Justice
 Out of Sight, Out of Mind
 Deception

Season Two
 A Friend in Need
 Surprise
 A Present for Beauty
 The Sea Horses
 Hope
 At Risk
 Greed Fever
 The Poisoners
 Bush Symphony
 The Convicts
 Call of the Wild (Part One)
 Call of the Wild (Part Two)

Specials
 Horsepower
 Horse Sense

Season 2 (1992)
 The Fugitive
 Recovery
 Gymkhana
 The Run Away
 Horse Thief
 Accident
 Daylight Robbery
 The Search
 Hunted
 The Imposter
 The Detectives
 Trespasser
 Haunted House
 The Race
 Gold Fever
 The Arrival
 Bella Remembers
 The Fair
 Eureka
 Bella's Dilemma
 Sweet Reward
 The Petition
 Held to Ramsom
 The Exchange
 Captured
 The Wedding

Video releases

Questar, Gaiam Inc., Morningstar Entertainment, and perhaps others have released a number of one-episode and two-episode VHS volumes and sets, all of which appear to be limited to the New Zealand production.

Questar Entertainment released 24 of 26 episodes from the 1990–1991 production in a Region 1 six-DVD set, and billed as Seasons One and Two of the Treasured Series. The season split and episode order for these DVDs is as for the "US airing"(shown above), minus the two "Specials", which were omitted from this DVD release. Despite being split into two seasons, only the entire set was available for purchase.

Umbrella Entertainment released the 1990–1991 production on DVD for Australia in Region 4 and Region 0, billed as "The New Adventures of Black Beauty – 4-Disk Set". As with the previous release, this set seems to present the New Zealand production as the entire series. However, in this case, there is no attempt to split the set into two "seasons", and no episodes were omitted.

Image Entertainment released both productions on DVD in Region 1 as two seasons of the same show. The Season 1 DVD set contains all 26 episodes of the 1990–1991 production, including the two omitted by Questar. The Season 2 DVD set contains all 26 episodes of the 1992 production.

In 2012 Madacy Entertainment and Image Entertainment released The Best of Black Beauty, a 10 disk Region 1 box set containing 42 episodes of The Adventures of Black Beauty and 44 episodes of The New Adventures of Black Beauty, with episodes from both the New Zealand and Australian productions.

The New Adventures of Black Beauty episodes included in The Best of Black Beauty are:

Season 1 (1990–1991) all episodes included
Disc 1: The Old World, A Horse Like Beauty, Breaking In, Ride a Black Horse, Deceptive Appearances, Fear of Water, Treasure Hunt, The Birdman
Disc 2: Different Races, A Question of Justice, Horsepower, Horse Sense, Surprise, A Present for Beauty, The Sea Horses, Hope
Disc 3: At Risk, Greed Fever, The Poisoners, Bush Symphony, The Convicts, A Friend in Need, Out of Sight Out of Mind, Deception, Call of the Wild (Part One), Call of the Wild

Season 2 (1992) 8 episodes omitted
Disc 4: The Fugitive, Recovery, Gymkhana, The Run Away, Horse Thief, Accident, Daylight Robbery, The Search
Disc 5: Bella Remembers, The Fair, Eureka, Bella's Dilemma, Sweet Reward, The Petition, Held to Ramsom, The Exchange, Captured, The Wedding

For the rest of the episodes in this set, see The Adventures of Black Beauty.

See also

 Black Beauty, 1877 novel
 The New Adventures of Black Beauty available on the Retro Television Network

References

External links

Screenonline entry

1990 British television series debuts
1991 British television series endings
1990s British children's television series
1990 New Zealand television series debuts
1990 New Zealand television series endings
1990s New Zealand television series
Black Beauty
ITV children's television shows
ITV television dramas
Period family drama television series
British television shows based on children's books
Australian television shows based on children's books
Television shows funded by NZ on Air
Television series by Fremantle (company)
Television series by ITV Studios
English-language television shows
Three (TV channel) original programming
New Zealand drama television series